Aqa Molk (also Romanized as Āqā Molk and Āqā Malek) is a village in Lalehabad Rural District, Lalehabad District, Babol County, Mazandaran Province, Iran. At the 2006 census, its population was 1,298, in 351 families.

References 

Populated places in Babol County